Apytalaukis Manor or Zabielos Manor (Lithuanian: Apytalaukio dvaras; Zabielų dvaras) is a former residential manor in Apytalaukis village, Kėdainiai district, Lithuania.

History 
The manor was owned by Šiukštos, Karpiai, Tiškevičiai, Zabielos families. In the beginning of 18th century, Šiukšta built the first brick palace. In 1819, a park closely resembling an English garden was created. It was later expanded in the mid-19th century. By the initiative of Zabielos, the palace was rebuilt in 1850 and 1880 probably according to a project of the Polish architect Kozłowski. In front of the manor there is a decorative pool. After the Second World War the manor was rebuilt in 1954. In 1976, the manor became a psychoneurological boarding school and later served as pensionate for Kėdainiai. Currently Apytalaukis Manor is abandoned.

On 9 September 2022 abandoned Apytalaukis Manor was heavily damaged by fire.

References

Manor houses in Lithuania
Neoclassical architecture in Lithuania